Shovana Narayan is a recognised Indian Kathak dancer and a career officer with Indian Audit and Accounts Service. She performs in India and internationally, and has been awarded the Padma Shri. She trained under Birju Maharaj.

Early life and education 
Sadhna Bose in Kolkata and Guru Kundal Lal in Mumbai initiated Narayan into Kathak at the age of four.

She studied at Miranda House in Delhi, India, graduating with a master's degree in Physics in 1972. She completed M.Phil in Defence and Strategic Studies from University of Madras in 2008 and M.Phil in Social Sciences from Punjab University in 2001. She also worked as a career officer for the Indian Audits & Accounts Service and retired in 2010. She is married to Dr. Herbert Traxl, Austrian Ambassador to India (retired).

Achievements in dance career
As a "performer and guru," Shovana Narayan has performed widely in several prestigious national and international festivals and before several heads of state and governments and has trained several Kathak artists of the young generation.

As a "choreographer-performer," Shovana Narayan has spearheaded and produced international collaborative works with leading dancers of western classical ballet, flamenco, tap dance, Buddhist chants with Buddhist monks, as well as dancing the compositions of western classical composers. She was the creative director-producer-dancer of the first-ever trilogy involving western classical dance-Kathak-flamenco in "The Dawn After" in 1994. She was also the creative director of the opening and closing ceremonies of the 6th abylimpics 2003, held at New Delhi. She delivered the opening & closing ceremonies of the Commonwealth Games Delhi in 2010. She has spearheaded and produced several collaborative works with leading dancers of several Indian classical dance styles. She was also the creative director-producer for:
 the classical dance sequence in the opening ceremony of the Golden Jubilee Celebrations of Indian Independence at National Stadium, 1997
 the ballet on the First War of Independence on Begum Hazrat Mahal
 the ballet for Guru Gobind Singh’s Tercentenary celebrations of the Khalsa panth, 1999

Some of her choreographies are:
 the dance ballet "Kadambari: The Poet’s Muse" (2012) on the influence of sister-in-law, Kadambari on Nobel Laureate Rabindranath Tagore, a subject never attempted before
 the genre of dance enactments to philosophical themes with the eminent philosopher, late Prof Ramchandra Gandhi that was based on the lives of contemporary thinkers and sages (Vivekanand, Ramana Maharshi, Francis of Assisi, Mahatma Gandhi, Ramkrishna Paramhansa)
 a soliloquy to "Shakuntala" (by Maithili Sharan Gupt), which rejuvenated the narrative tradition of the North-Indian dance form

As an "organiser," Shovana Narayan organises annually:
 a festival for young torchbearers of classical performing arts ‘LalitĀrpan Festival’ at India Habitat Centre
 the Asavari festival featuring maestros of classical performing arts
 the annual day ‘Rhythm & Joy’ of young students of Kathak (for over two decades)

Research and films
Shovana has researched and discovered 8 Kathak villages near Gaya with documentary and official records. She collaborated with Sanskrit & epigraphy scholar KK Mishra, who discovered Prakrit inscription in Asokan-Brahmi script relating to Kathak dated to 4th century BC. She is the first dancer to have conceived, conceptualised and brought out a dance video on the philosophy and legend of the immortal Khajuraho temples entitled ‘Dance of the Temples’. She is the leading actor in films "Akbar’s Bridge" (Hindi) and "Das Geheimnis des Indisches Tanz" (German).

Over 80 articles with in-depth research were published in several national newspapers, recognised journals etc. such as the Times of India, the Tribune, the Asian Age, in journals of Sangeet Natak Akademi, Rajasthan University, UNESCO and several others.

Books

By Shovana Narayan

Awards and honours
Padma Shri, 1992
Sangeet Natak Akademi Award 1999–2000
Delhi Government's Parishad Samman
Rajiv Smriti Puraskar
Bihar Gaurav Puraskar, 1985
Indira Priyadarshini Samman
Rajdhani Ratna Award
Shringar Shiromani Award
Rotary International Award
Bharat Nirman Award
National Integration Award
Oisca Award (Japan), 1990–91
Dadabhai Naoroji Award, 1993
Kelvinator's GR8Award
FICCI's FLO award

See also
 Indian women in dance

References

External links
Artistic biodata
 Home page
Work contact at IA&AS

Indian female classical dancers
Performers of Indian classical dance
Recipients of the Padma Shri in literature & education
Recipients of the Sangeet Natak Akademi Award
Living people
Kathak exponents
Delhi University alumni
Women artists from Delhi
Dancers from Kerala
20th-century Indian dancers
20th-century Indian women artists
1950 births
Indian autobiographers